Frost Farm may refer to:

Robert Frost Farm (Derry, New Hampshire), a National Historic Landmark
Frost Farm (Korpi Rd., Dublin, New Hampshire), listed on the National Register of Historic Places in Cheshire County, New Hampshire
Frost Farm (Old Marlborough Rd., Dublin, New Hampshire), listed on the NRHP in Cheshire County, New Hampshire
Robert Frost Farm (Ripton, Vermont), NRHP-listed
Robert Frost Farm (South Shaftsbury, Vermont), listed on the National Register of Historic Places in Bennington County, Vermont